Charles E. Phelps is the former provost of the University of Rochester, from July 1, 1994 until he retired on July 31, 2007. He is an expert on health and health care economics.

Career
Phelps started his career at the RAND Corporation, working from 1971-1984, when he joined the University of Rochester as a professor and director of the public policy analysis program.

Phelps held a variety of leadership positions, including chair of the Department of Community and Preventive Medicine in the School of Medicine and Dentistry. There he created a PhD program in health services research and policy.

In 1994, Phelps became the University's provost. He holds the titles of University Professor and provost emeritus.

Since retiring as provost in 2007, Phelps published the book Eight Questions You Should Ask about Our Health Care System: (Even if the Answers Make You Sick), as well as maintaining a health economics consulting practice, serving on two committees for the Institute of Medicine of the National Academy of Sciences (now the National Academy of Medicine), and chairing a committee that helped create undergraduate majors in public health at University of Rochester. During the 2008-2009, Phelps served as a fellow at the Center for Advanced Studies in the Behavioral Sciences at Stanford University.

Expertise
In 1991, he was elected to the Institute of Medicine of the National Academy of Sciences and to the National Bureau for Economic Research. He served two terms on the Report Review Committee of the National Academies.

Phelps is the author of Health Economics.

Phelps participated from 1997 to 2007 in the Association of American Universities' Committee on Digital Technology and Intellectual Property Rights. He also testified before Congress in June 1998 on issues pertaining to the implementation of the World Intellectual Property Organization treaty and has spoken on related matters in conferences on these issues sponsored by, among others, the Department of Commerce. He also testified, in July 2005, on patent reform for the Senate Judiciary Committee's Subcommittee on Intellectual Property.

Education
Phelps received his bachelor's degree in mathematics from Pomona College in Claremont, California in 1965. He then earned an MBA in hospital administration and a PhD in business economics from the University of Chicago in 1973.

References

External links 
Provost Phelps' Page
About the University of Rochester

University of Rochester
Year of birth missing (living people)
Living people
Pomona College alumni
Members of the National Academy of Medicine